Peleteria is a widespread genus of flies in the family Tachinidae.

Species

P. abdominalis Robineau-Desvoidy, 1830
P. acutiforceps Zimin, 1961
P. adelphe (Zimin, 1961)
P. adentata (Zimin, 1961)
P. aralica (Smirnov, 1922)
P. bidentata Chao & Zhou, 1987
P. chaoi (Zimin, 1961)
P. corusca (Richter, 1972)
P. curtiunguis Zimin, 1961
P. erschoffi (Portschinsky, 1882)
P. ferina (Zetterstedt, 1844)
P. flavobasicosta Chao & Zhou, 1987
P. frater (Chao & Shi, 1982)
P. fuscata (Chao, 1963)
P. honghuang Chao, 1979
P. kolomyetzi (Zimin, 1965)
P. iavana (Wiedemann, 1819)
P. kuanyan (Chao, 1979)
P. lianghei Chao, 1979
P. manomera Chao, 1982
P. maura Chao & Shi, 1982
P. melania Chao & Shi, 1982
P. meridionalis (Robineau-Desvoidy, 1830)
P. mesnili (Zimin, 1965)
P. micans (Zimin, 1961)
P. minima (Zimin, 1935)
P. nigrifacies (Zimin, 1961)
P. nigrita (Zimin, 1961)
P. nitella Chao, 1982
P. nix (Zimin, 1961)
P. pallida (Zimin, 1935)
P. paramonovi (Zimin, 1935)
P. placuna Chao, 1982
P. popelii (Portshinsky, 1882)
P. prompta (Meigen, 1824)
P. propinqua (Zimin, 1961)
P. pseudoershovi (Zimin, 1935)
P. qutu Chao, 1979
P. riwogeensis Chao & Shi, 1982
P. rubescens (Robineau-Desvoidy, 1830)
P. rubihirta Chao & Zhou, 1987
P. ruficornis (Macquart, 1835)
P. semiglabra (Zimin, 1961)
P. sibirica Smirnov, 1922
P. sphyricera (Macquart, 1835)
P. trifurca (Chao, 1963)
P. triseta Zimin, 1961
P. umbratica Zimin, 1961
P. varia (Fabricius, 1794)
P. versuta (Loew, 1871)
P. xenoprepes (Loew, 1874)

References

Tachininae
Tachinidae genera
Taxa named by Jean-Baptiste Robineau-Desvoidy